Alken is a railway station in the municipality of Alken, Limburg, Belgium. The station opened on 8 December 1847 and is located on line 21. The train services are operated by National Railway Company of Belgium (NMBS).

The first station building opened in 1847. The current building dates from 1903.

Train services
The station is served by the following services:

Intercity services (IC-03) Blankenberge - Bruges - Ghent - Brussels - Leuven - Hasselt - Genk

References

External links
 
Railway stations in Belgium
Railway stations in Limburg (Belgium)
Railway stations in Belgium opened in 1847